Pherbellia argyra is a species of fly in the family Sciomyzidae. It is found in the  Palearctic.

References

External links
Images representing Pherbellia at BOLD

Sciomyzidae
Insects described in 1967
Muscomorph flies of Europe